Harvey Murphy may refer to:
 Harvey Murphy (basketball)
 Harvey Murphy (American football)
 Harvey Murphy (Canadian labour activist)